This list of University of Iowa alumni includes notable current and former students of the University of Iowa.

Academia 

 Michael J. Budds, Musicologist and professor at the University of Missouri School of Music, inducted into the Missouri Music Hall of Fame
 Edwin Adams Davis – M.A. from Iowa; historian of Louisiana; father of Louisiana state archives; Louisiana State University professor
 Shardé M. Davis – Assistant Professor in the Department of Communication at the University of Connecticut .
 James R. Dow – emeritus professor of German at Iowa State University
 R. William Field – Associate Professor, College of Public Health, University of Iowa
 Elnora M. Gilfoyle – occupational therapist; Dean of the College of Applied Human Sciences and Provost/Academic Vice President at Colorado State University
 Michael P. Johnson – emeritus professor of sociology, Pennsylvania State University
 James Kennedy – professor of the history of the Netherlands at the University of Amsterdam
 Otto Kraushaar – former president of Goucher College, long-time professor in philosophy at Smith College
 Minnette Gersh Lenier – teacher who used stage magic to improve students' learning skills
 Cindy Lovell – educator and writer; executive director of the Mark Twain Boyhood Home & Museum and Mark Twain House
 Robert Moyers – Founder of Center of Growth and Development at University of Michigan
 Tina Passman - classical scholar
 Jewel Prestage – Dean of the School of Public Policy and Urban Affairs at Southern University. First African-American woman to earn Ph.D. in Political Science.
 W. Ann Reynolds – chancellor of the California State University and City University of New York
 Noliwe Rooks - associate director of the African-American program at Princeton University, W.E.B. Du Bois Professor of Literature at Cornell University, chair of and professor in the Africana Studies Department at Brown University, founding director of the Segrenomics Lab at Brown University
 Jim Rossi – law professor at Vanderbilt University
 Clifford V. Smith, Jr. – 4th chancellor of University of Wisconsin–Milwaukee
 William A. Staples – president of the University of Houston–Clear Lake
 John E. Visser – President of Emporia State University, 1967–1984
 Pramod P. Wangikar – Chemical Engineer and professor at Department of Chemical Engineering, Indian Institute of Technology Bombay

Business 
 Helen Brockman – fashion designer
 John Bucksbaum – former chairman and chief executive officer of GGP Inc.
 Jim Foster – founder of the Arena Football League
 Paul P. Harris – lawyer and founder of the first Rotary Club
 Scott Heiferman – founder and CEO, Meetup.com; founder, Fotolog.com
 Howard R. Hughes, Sr. – father of aviation pioneer and film producer Howard Robard Hughes, Jr. and builder of his fortune that started his empire
 Kerry Killinger – chairman and CEO of Washington Mutual
 Bill Perkins – hedge fund manager, film producer
 Richard J. Schnieders — former chairman, president, and CEO of Sysco
 C. Maxwell Stanley – engineer, entrepreneur, philanthropist; founder of Stanley Consultants and The Stanley Foundation; co-founder of HON Industries
 Ted Waitt – co-founder of Gateway, Inc.
 Frank R. Wallace (pen name of Wallace Ward), 1957, entrepreneur, publisher, writer, and developer of the Neo-Tech philosophy

Government and politics 
 Cindy Axne, United States Congresswoman
 Theodore J. Bauer – former head of the Centers for Disease Control and Prevention
 Fred H. Blume – Justice of the Wyoming Supreme Court for 42 years
 David E. Bonior – formerly represented Michigan in the United States House of Representatives; Former member of President Barack Obama's Economic Advisory Board
 Terry E. Branstad – two-time Governor of Iowa, and longest-tenured Governor in the nation
 John Burke – tenth Governor of North Dakota
 James Cartwright – retired U.S. Marine Corps General and the 8th Vice Chairman of the Joint Chiefs of Staff
 Norm Coleman – former Junior Republican U.S. Senator of Minnesota
 James Dooge – Irish senator and academic in the area of Hydrology; served as the Minister of Foreign Affairs in the Irish Government, and instrumental in forming the framework of the modern European Union and beginning the debate on climate change
 Martha Angle Dorsett – first woman admitted to the Bar of Minnesota (in 1878)
 James B. French – member of the Wisconsin State Assembly
 Greg Ganske – politician from Iowa
 Paul C. Gartzke – Presiding Judge of the Wisconsin Court of Appeals
 Mads Gilbert – Norwegian doctor in Gaza providing humanitarian care at Al-Shifa Hospital during the 2008–2009 Israel–Gaza conflict
Lea Giménez, Master's Degree in Economics, Minister of Finance (Paraguay)
 Silas B. Hays – Surgeon General of the United States Army
 Leo A. Hoegh – former Governor of Iowa and National Security Council member
 David W. Hopkins – former member of the U.S. House of Representatives from Missouri
 Chuck Horner – United States Air Force general; commanded Coalition Air Forces during the Gulf War
 Edward F. Howrey, chair of the Federal Trade Commission
 Cheryl L. Johnson, lawyer and 36th Clerk of the United States House of Representatives 
 Patty Judge, former Lieutenant Governor of Iowa and 2016 candidate for the US Senate
 George Koval – Soviet intelligence officer and Hero of the Russian Federation
 Robert L. Larson – former member of the Iowa Supreme Court
 Donald P. Lay – judge of the Eighth Circuit
 Ronald H. Lingren – member of the Wisconsin State Assembly
 Marry Mascher – member of the Iowa House of Representatives
 Andy McKean – politician in the state of Iowa
 John Walter Grant MacEwan – MS 1928; Western Canadian Lieutenant Governor of Alberta; Canadian legislator; Mayor of Calgary
 Jayaprakash Narayan – Indian freedom fighter, social reformer, politician
 Kay A. Orr – first woman Governor of Nebraska; Republican
 John E. Osborn – former Commissioner, U.S. Advisory Commission on Public Diplomacy; former executive vice president and general counsel, Cephalon, Inc.
 Gregory A. Peterson – Judge of the Wisconsin Court of Appeals
 John Pickler – member of the United States House of Representatives
 Coleen Rowley – shared 2002 Time "Person of the Year" award; the FBI whistleblower who helped bring in terrorist suspect Zacarias Moussaoui
 Lawrence F. Scalise – Attorney General of Iowa (1965–1966)
 Juanita Kidd Stout – first woman appointed as a federal judge; Pennsylvania Supreme Court Justice
 Jim Summerville – Tennessee Senator
 Wang Huning – member of the Politburo Standing Committee of the Chinese Communist Party, Chinese political theorist, former Dean of the School of Law and Chair of the Department of International Politics, Fudan University
 Perry Warjiyo, (Ph.D, 1991), Central Bank Governors, The Republic of Indonesia
 Hugh E. Wild – U.S. Air Force Brigadier General
 Ann Williams – member of Illinois House of Representatives
 Wu Jin – Minister of Education of Taiwan, 1996–1998

Art and architecture 
 Mildred Beltre – multi-disciplinary artist; co-founder of Brooklyn Hi-Art! Machine
 Ryan Bliss – 3D artist; founder of Digital Blasphemy
 Shirley Briggs – artist and writer; studied under Grant Wood; provided artwork for a number of projects within the U.S. Fish and Wildlife Service, U.S. Bureau of Reclamation, and worked on a number of dioramas for the Smithsonian Institution's Museum of Natural History
 David Cantine – Canadian artist
 Elizabeth Catlett – painter; studied under Grant Wood; first African American woman to earn an MFA from the University of Iowa
 Robert D. Cocke – painter
 Eve Drewelowe  – painter
 Mary Hecht – American-born Canadian sculptor
 Joey Kirkpatrick – (born 1952) glass artist, sculptor, wire artist, and educator. 
 Baulu Kuan – artist and curator
Barbara Lekberg – metal sculptor
 Evan Lindquist – Artist Laureate of the State of Arkansas
 Kenneth Roderick O'Neal (1908–1989), architect
 Charles Ray – contemporary artist
 Joe Sharpnack – editorial cartoonist
 Rudi Stern – multimedia artist
 Kirsten Ulve – graphic artist

Literature and journalism 
 Melissa Albert – author of young adult fiction
 Goodwin Tutum Anim – Ghanaian journalist
 Mildred Benson – writer under pen name Carolyn Keene of Nancy Drew books
 T.C. Boyle – PEN/Faulkner award-winning writer (World's End, Drop City)
 Tom Brokaw – broadcast journalist, former anchor (NBC Nightly News), author (The Greatest Generation); dropped out after 1 year
 Elizabeth C. Bunce – author (A Curse Dark as Gold, Premeditated Myrtle, Cold-Blooded Myrtle)
 Chelsea Cain – writer (Heartsick, Mockingbird)
 William R. Clabby – journalist and editor for The Wall Street Journal, winner of a Gerald Loeb Award, and an executive at various Dow Jones news subsidiaries.
 Sandra Cisneros – author (The House on Mango Street)
 Max Allan Collins – writer of comic strip Dick Tracy (Chester Gould was the creator and Collins took over in 1977 when Gould retired); also writes mystery novels
 Justin Cronin – author (The Passage, The Twelve)
 Rita Dove – 1993 Poet Laureate of the United States
 David Drake – science-fiction writer (Hammer's Slammers series)
 Andre Dubus – short story writer (Killings – adapted into 2001 film In the Bedroom)
 Jeannette Eyerly – writer of young adult fiction
 Joshua Ferris – novelist
 Charles Gaines – author (Pumping Iron) and inventor of paintball
 George Gallup – founder of the Gallup Poll
 Ezzat Goushegir – playwright
 Garth Greenwell – author (What Belongs to You)
 Oscar Hahn – author
 Joe Haldeman – science-fiction writer (The Forever War)
 Kathryn Harrison – author (Thicker than Water)
 A.M. Homes – author (The Safety of Objects)
 L. D. Hotchkiss – editor-in-chief, Los Angeles Times
 John Irving – writer (A Widow for One Year, The World According to Garp)
 Amy Jacobson – Chicago broadcast journalist
 Leslie Jamison – author (The Empathy Exams)
 Denis Johnson – author (Jesus' Son)
 W.P. Kinsella – author (Shoeless Joe, the book on which Field of Dreams was based)
 William Lashner – author of Past Due
 Robie Macauley – novelist and editor of Playboy
 Anthony Marra – author (A Constellation of Vital Phenomena)
 Bharati Mukherjee – Bengali-American writer
 Flannery O'Connor – novelist and author of numerous short stories
 Chris Offutt – short story writer and essayist
 Ann Patchett – author (Bel Canto, State of Wonder)
 Tappy Phillips – consumer affairs reporter for WABC-TV in New York City; correspondent for ABC News
 La Ferne Price – philosopher and author
 Jim Simmerman – poet; founded creative writing program at Northern Arizona University
 Wallace Stegner – author
 Stewart Stern – screenwriter (Rebel Without a Cause, Sybil)
 Douglas Unger – novelist and founder of UNLV's creative writing MFA program
 Bertha M. Wilson – dramatist, critic, actress
 Yu Guangzhong – Taiwanese poet and author
 Torrey Peters, author (Detransition, Baby )

Pulitzer Prize winners 
 Stephen Berry – 1993 Pulitzer Prize for Investigative Reporting for story he co-wrote for the Orlando Sentinel; associate professor in School of Journalism and Mass Communication
 Robert Olen Butler Jr. – won the 1993 Pulitzer Prize for fiction
 Marquis Childs – commentator; 1969 winner for distinguished commentary
 Paul Conrad – editorial cartoonist for the Los Angeles Times; won in 1964, 1971, and 1984
 Michael Cunningham – writer/novelist (The Hours)
 Jorie Graham – poet (1996 winner for The Dream of the Unified Field: Selected Poems 1974–1994) and MacArthur Fellow on faculty of Iowa Writers' Workshop
 Paul Harding – author (Tinkers)
 Robert Hass – poet (2008 winner for Time and Materials: Poems 1997–2005) and former Poet Laureate of the United States
 Benny Johnson – columnist and host The Benny Report on NewsMax TV
 Josephine Johnson – novelist (1935 winner for her first novel, Now in November), writing instructor
 Donald Justice – poet (1980 winner for Selected Poems)
 Tracy Kidder – 1982 winner for The Soul of a New Machine
 James Alan McPherson – author (1978 winner for Elbow Room, becoming the first African-American to win the Pulitzer for fiction) and MacArthur Fellow on faculty of Iowa Writers' Workshop
 Marilynne Robinson – 2005 winning author for Gilead: A Novel; faculty in Iowa Writers' Workshop
 Jane Smiley – novelist; 1992 winner for A Thousand Acres
 William De Witt Snodgrass – confessional poet; 1960 Pulitzer Prize for Poetry
 Mark Strand – poet; 1999 winner for A Blizzard of One
 Tennessee Williams – playwright; won for A Streetcar Named Desire  in 1948 and Cat on a Hot Tin Roof in 1955

Performing arts 
 Tom Arnold – actor (Roseanne, True Lies) and host of Fox Sports Net's talk show Best Damn Sports Show Period
 Lemuel Ayers, Tony Award winning designer and producer 
 Scott Beck – filmmaker (A Quiet Place)
 Rita Bell – singer, entertainer
 Macdonald Carey – actor (Days of Our Lives)
 David Daniels – conductor and author
 Don DeFore – actor (The Adventures of Ozzie and Harriet, Hazel)
 Ellen Dolan – soap opera actress (Guiding Light, As the World Turns)
 Duck's Breath Mystery Theater (Dan Coffey, Bill Allard, Merle Kessler, Leon Martrell, and Jim Turner) – touring comedy troupe featured on National Public Radio's All Things Considered
 David Eigenberg – actor (Steve Brady on Sex and the City)
 Simon Estes – bass baritone opera singer, formerly of the New York Metropolitan Opera
 Tanna Frederick – stage and independent film actress
 Bruce French – actor (Mr. Mom, Legal Eagles, Fletch)
 Robin Green – executive producer of the HBO series The Sopranos
 Don Hall – director of the Disney animated movie Big Hero 6 which won the Oscar for best animated feature in 2015 and Moana (2016 film)
 Jake Johnson – actor  (New Girl, Paper Heart, Get Him to the Greek, Safety Not Guaranteed, 21 Jump Street, Drinking Buddies, Jurassic World and Tag).
 John Shifflett – jazz double bass player and teacher at San Jose State University
 Joy Harjo – poet, songwriter
 Candace Hilligoss – actress (1960 film Carnival of Souls)
 Mary Beth Hurt – actress (The World According to Garp, Interiors)
 Toby Huss – actor, creator of Artie, the Strongest Man in the World from The Adventures of Pete and Pete, which he created at No Shame Theatre at the university
 Barry Kemp – producer (Coach, Newhart) (Hayden Fox, the title character of Coach, was named after Iowa football coach Hayden Fry)
 Alex Ko – actor (Billy Elliot the Musical), author, film director
 Ashton Kutcher – actor (That '70s Show, Two and a Half Men), producer (created Punk'd), entrepreneur
 Adam LeFevre – film and television actor, playwright
 Nicholas Meyer – director (Star Trek II: The Wrath of Khan)
 Greg Morris – actor (Barney Collier in original Mission: Impossible TV series)
 Terry O'Quinn – actor (Lost)
 Lara Parker – actress (Angelique in the serial Dark Shadows)
James Romig – composer
 Eugene Rousseau – saxophonist
 Brandon Routh – actor (Superman Returns)
Joe Russo – director-writer Captain America: The Winter Soldier, Captain America: Civil War, Avengers: Infinity War, Avengers: Endgame, and TV shows Arrested Development (TV series) and Community (TV Series)
 Paul Rust – actor (I Love You, Beth Cooper and Love)
 Jean Seberg – actress (Breathless, Paint Your Wagon, Airport)
 William Oscar Smith – jazz double bassist
 David Strackany – musician
 Susan Werner – singer-songwriter
 Brooks Wheelan – comedian (Saturday Night Live)
 Gene Wilder – actor (Silver Streak, Young Frankenstein, Willy Wonka and the Chocolate Factory)
 Chris Witaske – actor (Love, The Bear, Chicago Party Aunt)
 Bryan Woods – filmmaker (A Quiet Place)
 David Bryan Woodside – actor (Wayne Palmer on the TV series 24)

Academy Award winners 
 Diablo Cody – screenwriter, winning an Academy Award for Best Original Screenplay
 Charles Guggenheim – documentary filmmaker, winning four Academy Awards from twelve nominations

Grammy Award winners 
 Al Jarreau – seven-time Grammy Award-winning vocalist
 David Sanborn – six-time Grammy-winning saxophonist

Science and technology 
 Hind Al-Abadleh – chemist and environmental scientist
 Archie Alexander – first African-American graduate (in engineering); governor of the Virgin Islands
 M. M. Ayoub – a pioneer in the field of ergonomics
 Alfred Marshall Bailey – ornithologist and long-term director of the Denver Museum of Natural History
 Antoine Bechara - professor of psychology and neuroscience
 Sidney W. Bijou, (1908–2009) – developmental psychologist
 Mark Frederick Boyd - malariologist
 Lawrence Einhorn – pioneering oncologist whose research increased testicular cancer survival rates from 10% to 95%
 Mildred Adams Fenton – geologist, paleontologist, writer on paleontology
 Leon Festinger – social psychologist who was responsible for the theory of cognitive dissonance
 James E. Hansen – heads NASA Goddard Institute for Space Studies; recognized in Times "100 Most Influential People of 2006" for his efforts to bring understanding and fighting the effects of global climate change
 Bruce C. Heezen – led a team from Columbia University that mapped the Mid-Atlantic Ridge
 Darrell Huff – writer known for best-selling book How to Lie with Statistics
 Marshall Kay – geologist and Penrose Medal winner
 Tom Krimigis – space scientist, physicist
 E.F. Lindquist – co-founder of the ACT examination
 Gregor Luthe – chemist, toxicologist, nanotechnologist, inventor and entrepreneur
 Charles F. Lynch – Epidemiologist
 Mark Mattson – neuroscientist at the National Institutes of Health and Johns Hopkins University School of Medicine
 Deane Montgomery – mathematician
 Mary Lawson Neff – neurologist
 Kent Norman – cognitive psychologist and expert on computer rage
 Clair Cameron Patterson – geochemist who developed the uranium–lead dating method into lead–lead dating, worked on the Manhattan Project, and led early campaigns against lead poisoning
 James Van Allen – space scientist
 Oswald Veblen – mathematician
 Shirley Briggs – conducted work in pesticide and synthetic chemical research
 Wang Shizhen – Chinese academician, father of Chinese nuclear medicine
 George Ojemann – Neurosurgeon and cognitive neuroscientist
 Herbert Jasper – Pioneer of surgical epileptology at the Montreal Neurological Institute
 Mildred Mott Wedel – Social scientist, archaeologist, ethnohistorian

Sports

Baseball 

 Tim Costo - MLB first baseman from 1992-1993
 Jack Dittmer - MLB second baseman from 1952-1957
 Cal Eldred – Major League Baseball pitcher who played for 14 years
 Milo Hamilton – sportscaster for the Iowa Hawkeyes and seven different Major League Baseball teams; recipient of the Ford C. Frick Award
Chris Hatcher - MLB outfielder in 1998
 Hal Manders – relief pitcher in Major League Baseball who played in 1941, 1942, and 1946
 Wes Obermueller – Major League Baseball pitcher
 Jim Sundberg – catcher for the Texas Rangers and other teams
 Art Reinhart – Major League Baseball pitcher, 1919–1928

Basketball 
 B. J. Armstrong – NBA point guard for the Chicago Bulls
 Jordan Bohannon – Hawkeyes men's player from 2016–2022; most career games played in NCAA Division I men's history
 "Downtown" Freddie Brown – guard for the Seattle SuperSonics where he was captain of the 1978–79 World Championship team
 Carl Cain - Olympic gold medalist in 1956
 Caitlin Clark – Current Hawkeyes women's player
 Monika Czinano – Current Hawkeyes women's player
 Chuck Darling – member of the 1956 Summer Olympics gold medal basketball team
 Keno Davis – men's basketball coach at Providence College
 Ricky Davis – Los Angeles Clippers player
 Acie Earl – NBA basketball player
 Michelle Edwards - WNBA guard from 1997-2001
 Luka Garza – National College Player of the Year 2020-2021; current Minnesota Timberwolves player
 Bob Hansen – player for the Utah Jazz and Chicago Bulls; basketball analyst for the Hawkeye Radio Network
Pops Harrison - Iowa head coach from 1942-1950
 John Johnson – player on 1978–79 Seattle SuperSonics championship team
 Noble Jorgensen – player for the Sheboygan Red Skins, Tri-Cities Blackhawks and Syracuse Nationals
Dick Ives - played one season in the BAA
Ronnie Lester - NBA point guard from 1980-1986
Bill Logan - NBA center in 1956
 Brad Lohaus – NBA player
 Devyn Marble (born 1992) -  player for Maccabi Haifa of the Israeli Basketball Premier League
 Keegan Murray – player for the Sacramento Kings
 Don Nelson – player for the Boston Celtics and coach for the Golden State Warriors
Erv Prasse - NBL player from 1940-1946
 Tangela Smith – center for the WNBA Phoenix Mercury
Murray Wier - BAA guard from 1948-1951
Herb Wilkinson - drafted to the BAA
 Andre Woolridge (born 1973) – point guard

Football 
 Bret Bielema – NFL assistant coach, head coach of the University of Illinois football team
 Paul Burmeister – NFL quarterback, NFL Network anchor
 Jim Caldwell – offensive coordinator for the Baltimore Ravens
 Dallas Clark – tight end for the Colts, Buccaneers, and Ravens
 Sean Considine – Former NFL defensive safety and special teams, member of the Ravens' Super Bowl XLVII championship team
 Kerry Cooks – NFL defensive back
Dick Crayne - NFL fullback from 1936-1937
 John Derby – NFL linebacker
Aubrey Devine - College Football Hall of Fame quarterback
 Jeff Drost – NFL defensive tackle
 Wayne Duke – Commissioner of the Big Ten Conference 1971–1989
 Tim Dwight – NFL player
 Harold Ely – NFL player
 Dick Evans – NFL player
 Wesley Fry – general manager for the Oakland Raiders
 Robert Gallery – NFL offensive tackle, second overall pick in 2004 draft
Willis Glassgow - NFL halfback from 1930-1931
 Dennis Green – head coach with the Minnesota Vikings and Arizona Cardinals
 Merton Hanks – NFL defensive back (four-time Pro Bowl selection)
 Homer Harris – player in 1937; first African American captain of a Big Ten Conference team
 Jay Hilgenberg – center for Chicago Bears (seven-time Pro Bowl selection)
Jerry Hilgenberg - Iowa assistant coach from 1956-1963
Wally Hilgenberg - NFL linebacker from 1964-1979
 Walt Housman – football player
 Carlos James – Arena Football League player
 Cal Jones – one of two Iowa football players to have his jersey retired; won the Outland Trophy in 1955
 Nate Kaeding – NFL placekicker
 Harry Kalas – voice of the Philadelphia Phillies (MLB), NFL on Westwood One and NFL Films
 Aaron Kampman – NFL defensive end
 Alex Karras – professional football player and actor
 George Kittle – 2x Pro Bowler and 2x All-Pro tight end for the San Francisco 49ers; part of the 49ers Super Bowl LIV team
 Nile Kinnick – Iowa's 1939 Heisman trophy winner with Iowa's Kinnick Stadium named for him in 1972
 Dick Klein – professional football player
Paul Krause - NFL safety from 1964-1979
 Joe Laws – professional football player for the Green Bay Packers
Gordon Locke - College football hall of fame fullback
 Chuck Long – closest-ever Heisman Trophy runner-up in 1985; later a college head coach; analyst for the Big Ten Network
 Jim Miller – NFL offensive guard
 Tom Moore – longtime NFL coach and offensive coordinator for the Indianapolis Colts
 Bruce Nelson – guard and center
Ken Ploen - CFL hall of fame quarterback from 1957-1967
 Ed Podolak – player with the Kansas City Chiefs; football analyst for Hawkeye Radio Network
 Fred Roberts – player for the Portsmouth Spartans
 Eddie Robinson – winningest coach in NCAA Division I football history at Grambling State University from 1942 until 1997
 Reggie Roby – punter (three-time Pro Bowl Selection) for the Miami Dolphins
 Bob Sanders – free agent safety, member of the Indianapolis Colts' Super Bowl XLI championship team
 Tyler Sash – safety for the New York Giants' Super Bowl XLVI championship team
 Zud Schammel – NFL guard
Duke Slater - NFL linebacker from 1922-1931
 Scott Slutzker – NFL player
 Larry Station – two-time All-American player
 Bob Stoops – player and coach; former head coach at the University of Oklahoma
 Mark Stoops – player; head coach of the University of Kentucky
 Mike Stoops – player, coach; defensive coordinator at Oklahoma
Sherwyn Thorson - CFL player from 1962-1968
 Andre Tippett – Hall of Fame linebacker for the New England Patriots
 Emlen Tunnell – player; first African American to play for the New York Giants; later played for the Green Bay Packers
Clyde Williams - Coach and athletic director at Iowa State from 1907-1919
 Marshal Yanda – Pro Bowl offensive lineman for the Ravens; member of Super Bowl XLVII championship team

Mixed Martial Arts 
 Jordan Johnson (fighter) – professional Mixed Martial Artist, currently with the UFC
 Julie Kedzie – Two-time Hook n' Shoot Tournament Champion, National Karate Champion & fought in first women's MMA match on cable television

Other 

 Beth Beglin - Field hockey Olympic bronze medalist in 1984. Head coach at Iowa from 1988-1999
 Paul Brechler - Athletic director at Iowa and commissioner of the Western Athletic Conference
John Davey - Swam in 1988 and 1992 Olympics for Great Britain. Ten time Big Ten champion
 Kris Fillat - Field hockey player on US National Team
 Houry Gebeshian – Armenian Olympic gymnast at the 2016 Summer Olympics
Lincoln Hurring - Swam in 1952 and 1956 Olympics for New Zealand
Marcia Pankratz - Field hockey player on US national team 1985-1996. College field hockey coach.
 Wally Ris – 1948 Olympic swimmer, winner of two gold medals
 Bowen Stassforth – 1952 Olympic silver medalist swimmer 200 m breaststroke. Former world record holder in 200 and 100 breaststroke
Rafał Szukała - 1992 Olympic silver medalist in 100 butterfly for Poland
Artur Wojdat - 1988 Olympic bronze medalist in 400 free. Former world record holder in 400 freestyle

Track and field 
 Kineke Alexander - 400m runner competed in 2008, 2012, and 2016 Olympics
George Baird - ran 4x400 at 1928 Olympics
Charles Brookins - 400m hurdles at 1924 Olympics
Chan Coulter - 400m hurdles at 1924 Olympics
Francis X. Cretzmeyer – track and field coach, 1948–78; coached Ted Wheeler and Deacon Jones (1956 and 1960 Olympics)
Frank Cuhel - 1928 Olympic silver medalist in 400 hurdles
Nan Doak - marathoner
Troy Doris - triple jumper in 2016 Olympics
Rich Ferguson - ran 5000m at 1952 Olympics
Ed Gordon - long jumped at the 1928 Olympics
Deacon Jones – 1956 and 1960 Olympics, track and field
Anthuan Maybank – 1996 Olympic Games gold medalist in the men's 4x400 meter relay for the US
Ira Murchison - Former world record holder in 100 yard dash and Olympic gold medalist in 4x100
Diane Nukuri - Competed in 2000, 2012, 2016, and 2020 Olympics in various distance events
Harold Phelps - ran 5000m at 1924 Olympics
 Mel Rosen – track coach
George Saling – Olympic hurdler who won the 110-meter hurdles in the 1932 Summer Olympics
Jenny Spangler - ran marathon in 1996 Olympics
Laulauga Tausaga - thrower
Ted Wheeler - 1500 meters at 1956 Olympics
Eric Wilson - 400m runner at 1924 Olympics
Bashir Yamini - long jumper and football player

Wrestling 
 Royce Alger – 2x NCAA Champion (87' & 88') and retired mixed martial artist
Ed Banach – light heavyweight gold medalist at 1984 Olympic Games, Los Angeles
Lou Banach – heavyweight gold medalist at 1984 Olympic Games, Los Angeles
Stub Barron
 Paul Bradley – two-time NCAA All-American; professional mixed martial artist, formerly with the UFC and currently with Bellator
 Terry Brands – NCAA Champion in 1990 and 1992, 2000 Olympic bronze medalist, and two-time World freestyle Champion in 1993 & 1995
 Tom Brands – Outstanding Wrestler Award at the 1992 NCAA Tournament; World Champion in 1993; Olympic Champion in 1996
 Rico Chiapparelli – NCAA Champ in 1987; mixed martial arts trainer
 Barry Davis – bantamweight silver medalist 1984 Olympic Games, Los Angeles
 Ettore Ewen – professional wrestler for WWE under the name "Big E"
Randall Lewis – featherweight gold medalist at 1984 Olympic Games
Terrence McCann - Olympic gold medalist in 1960 freestyle bantamweight class
Lincoln McIlravy - Olympic bronze medalist in 2000 freestyle welterweight class
 Brent Metcalf – 2008 and 2010 NCAA Champion; 2008 Dan Hodge Trophy winner
 Steve Mocco – 2003 NCAA Division I Champion at Heavyweight; 2008 Olympic team member; current professional MMA fighter
 Tony Ramos – 2014 NCAA Champion
E. G. Schroeder - First wrestling and tennis coach at Iowa. Athletic director.
 Joe Williams – three-time NCAA Champion; 2001 and 2005 wrestling world bronze medalist
 Bill Zadick – 1996 NCAA Wrestling Champion, 2006 World Champion
 Mike Zadick – 2006 wrestling world silver medalist
 Jim Zalesky – three-time NCAA Champion; current coach for Oregon State University

References

External links 
 Notable University of Iowa Alums